Bowen-Jordan Farm is a historic home located near Siler City, Chatham County, North Carolina. It was built about 1825, and is a -story, Federal style frame dwelling. It has a steeply pitched gable roof and massive single stepped shoulder end chimneys. The house was expanded by mid- and late-19th century additions and enclosures.  Also on the property are the contributing kitchen / slave cabin and smokehouse.

It was listed on the National Register of Historic Places in 1985.

References

Houses on the National Register of Historic Places in North Carolina
Federal architecture in North Carolina
Houses completed in 1825
Houses in Chatham County, North Carolina
National Register of Historic Places in Chatham County, North Carolina
Slave cabins and quarters in the United States